Kondinsky District is an administrative and municipal district (raion), one of the nine in Khanty-Mansi Autonomous Okrug of Tyumen Oblast, Russia. It is located in the south of the autonomous okrug. Its administrative center is the urban locality (an urban-type settlement) of Mezhdurechensky. Population: 34,494 (2010 Census);  The population of Mezhdurechensky accounts for 32.1% of the district's total population.

References

Notes

Sources

Districts of Khanty-Mansi Autonomous Okrug